Samar Ranjan Sen (  28 July 2004) was an Indian agricultural economist who served at the International Bank for Reconstruction and Development as its executive director. He belonged to the Indian Economic Service of 1938 batch.

Biography 
Sen obtained his PhD from the London School of Economics in 1946 and later taught at Dacca University before partition.

The first member of the Indian Economic Service in 1938, Sen joined the Ministry of Agriculture in 1948 and served as advisor of the Planning Commission prior to his appointment at the World Bank.

After returning to India, he became a part of Reserve Bank of India's green revolution east (1985) and later became a member of the Sarkaria Commission. He also established research centers of agriculture in the country.

References

Further reading 
 

1900s births
2004 deaths
20th-century Indian economists
Indian agricultural economists
Academic staff of the University of Dhaka
Place of birth missing
Place of death missing